Fortress Mountain is a  peak in the Cascade Range located about  west of Lake Chelan in Chelan/Snohomish Counties, Washington, United States. It straddles the border between the Mount Baker-Snoqualmie National Forest and the Wenatchee National Forest, and is also part of the Glacier Peak Wilderness. Fortress Mountain is the highest point on Chiwawa Ridge, and other notable peaks on this ridge include Napeequa Peak, Buck Mountain, Brahma Peak, Bandit Peak, Mount Berge, Helmet Butte, and Chiwawa Mountain.

Geology
The Glacier Peak Wilderness of the North Cascades features some of the most rugged topography in the Cascade Range with craggy peaks, ridges, and deep glacial valleys. Geological events occurring many years ago created the diverse topography and drastic elevation changes over the Cascade Range leading to the various climate differences.

The history of the formation of the Cascade Mountains dates back millions of years ago to the late Eocene Epoch. With the North American Plate overriding the Pacific Plate, episodes of volcanic igneous activity persisted.  In addition, small fragments of the oceanic and continental lithosphere called terranes created the North Cascades about 50 million years ago. 

During the Pleistocene period dating back over two million years ago, glaciation advancing and retreating repeatedly scoured the landscape leaving deposits of rock debris. The "U"-shaped cross section of the river valleys are a result of recent glaciation. Uplift and faulting in combination with glaciation have been the dominant processes which have created the tall peaks and deep valleys of the North Cascades area.

Climate
Most weather fronts originate in the Pacific Ocean, and travel east toward the Cascade Mountains. As fronts approach, they are forced upward by the peaks of the Cascade Range, causing them to drop their moisture in the form of rain or snowfall onto the Cascades (Orographic lift). As a result, the Cascades experience high precipitation, especially during the winter months in the form of snowfall. During winter months, weather is usually cloudy, but, due to high pressure systems over the Pacific Ocean that intensify during summer months, there is often little or no cloud cover during the summer. The months July through September offer the most favorable weather for viewing or climbing this peak.

See also
List of highest mountain peaks in Washington

References

External links
 Weather forecast: Fortress Mountain

Mountains of Chelan County, Washington
Mountains of Snohomish County, Washington
North American 2000 m summits